The Lasley's College Apartments are a historic apartment complex at 1916 and 1922 Bruce Street in Conway, Arkansas, adjacent to the campus of the University of Central Arkansas.  It consists of two two-story brick buildings flanking a central courtyard.  Each building has a flat roof with parapet, and houses eight residential units, four one-bedroom and four two-bedroom units in each.  They were built in 1947 in response to the university's increasing demand for housing, and are a well-preserved example of period multiunit residential architecture.

The complex was listed on the National Register of Historic Places in 2011.

See also
National Register of Historic Places in Faulkner County, Arkansas

References

Residential buildings completed in 1947
Buildings and structures in Conway, Arkansas
Apartment buildings on the National Register of Historic Places in Arkansas
National Register of Historic Places in Faulkner County, Arkansas
1947 establishments in Arkansas